Sister Thomas Welder, OSB (born Diane Marie Welder; April 27, 1940June 22, 2020) was an American educator, academic administrator, and Benedictine nun. Born and raised in North Dakota, she entered Annunciation Monastery in 1959, at age 19. She began working at the Benedictine-sponsored Mary College in 1963 and served as its president from 1978 to 2009. Under Welder, the college expanded to become the University of Mary. She received North Dakota's highest honor, the Theodore Roosevelt Rough Rider Award, in 2004.

Early life and education
Diane Marie Welder was born on April 27, 1940, in Linton, North Dakota, to Mary Ann (née Kuhn) and Sebastian Welder. Her father died of a kidney condition in 1951; her mother became a Benedictine sister in 1968, after raising Welder and her siblings. Four of Welder's maternal aunts also joined religious orders. Welder attended Cathedral Elementary School and St. Mary's Central High School, Bismarck, North Dakota, graduating in 1958. She studied at the College of St. Benedict in Minnesota, where she discerned her vocation to religious life.

Welder returned to Bismarck to enter the community of Benedictine nuns at Annunciation Monastery. The Benedictines founded Mary College in 1959; Welder was a member of their first freshman class. She was given the religious name "Sister Thomas" when she entered the novitiate. She made a religious profession in 1961 and a perpetual monastic profession in 1964. She completed a bachelor's degree at the College of St. Scholastica in 1963 and received a master's degree in music from Northwestern University in 1968.

Career
Welder began working for Mary College in 1963. She taught music and chaired the humanities department. In 1978 she was named the school's fifth president. The college attained university status in 1986, becoming the University of Mary, and the enrollment increased from 925 students to nearly 3,000. As president, Welder was known for her ability to remember names and faces. She emphasized teaching servant leadership and Benedictine values. In 2004, she was granted the Theodore Roosevelt Rough Rider Award, the highest honor of the state of North Dakota. Her portrait is displayed in the North Dakota State Capitol. In 2009, she retired and was named President Emerita.

Death
Welder had polycystic kidney disease; she received two transplants, in 2001 and in 2011. She died in Bismarck, North Dakota, on June 22, 2020, after having been diagnosed with kidney cancer. The state governor, Doug Burgum, and the former governor and current senator John Hoeven expressed their condolences. Hoeven and Senator Kevin Cramer memorialized her in floor speeches to the United States Senate on June 24.

A visitation, open to the public, was held for Welder on June 28, 2020, by the University of Mary, in conjunction with the Benedictine Sisters of Annunciation Monastery, in the Our Lady of the Annunciation Chapel on the University's campus. During the seven-hour visitation period, guests were invited to pray before the body of Welder while friends and community leaders read aloud continuously from the St. John's Bible the Gospels of Luke and John. Notable readers included Senator John Hoeven and former First Lady Mikey Hoeven, former Governor Ed Schafer and former First Lady Nancy Schafer, among many others. At the end of the visitation, the Sisters of Annunciation Monastery led a vigil with Evening Prayer (or Vespers), after which Governor Doug Burgum offered a reflection.

The following morning, June 29, 2020, the visitation continued with the continuous reading of the St. John's Bible, this time from the Psalms, ending with the Song of Ascents, select psalms traditionally chanted by pilgrims concluding their travels by ascending the steps of Temple in Jerusalem. These final psalms were read by Senator Kevin Cramer and his wife Kris Cramer before concluding for the funeral liturgy.

The funeral Mass (liturgy) was celebrated by Monsignor James P. Shea, President of the University of Mary, with the Sisters of Annunciation Monastery singing as the choir. The University of Mary's President's Council (vice presidents) served as ushers. Shea also preached the homily, per a request of Welder made shortly before she died, using texts personally selected by Welder. Following the funeral, the congregation processed with the closed casket to the Sisters' cemetery where she was laid to rest.

Awards and honors

Theodore Roosevelt Rough Rider Award from the State of North Dakota – 2004
Scandinavian-American Hall of Fame of the Norsk Høstfest – 2007 inductee
 Doctor of the University, honoris causa, from the University of Mary – 2010
Caritas Award from Catholic Charities – 2013
 Honorary doctorate from Belmont Abbey College – 2015
 Honorary doctorate from St. Anselm College –  2017

References 

1940 births
2020 deaths
Educators from North Dakota
People from Bismarck, North Dakota
People from Emmons County, North Dakota
Benedictine nuns
American Benedictines
University of Mary
College of Saint Benedict and Saint John's University alumni
College of St. Scholastica alumni
Northwestern University alumni
Heads of universities and colleges in the United States
Women heads of universities and colleges
20th-century American Roman Catholic nuns
21st-century American Roman Catholic nuns